Snow in September is a Mongolian/French short drama film, directed by Lkhagvadulam Purev-Ochir and released in 2022. The film stars Sukhbat Munkhbaatar as Davka, a teenager in Ulaanbaatar who must change his views of intimacy and relationships when he meets a woman (Enkhgerel Baasanjav) who claims to be a friend of his mother's.

The film premiered at the 79th Venice International Film Festival, where it was the winner of the Orizzonti award for Best Short Film. It was subsequently screened at the 2022 Toronto International Film Festival, where it won the award for Best International Short Film.

References

External links

2022 films
2022 short films
Mongolian drama films
French drama films
French short films